This was a new event to the ITF Women's Circuit. 

Mandy Minella won the inaugural title, defeating Nicole Gibbs in the final, 2–6, 7–5, 6–2.

Seeds

Main draw

Finals

Top half

Bottom half

References 
 Main draw

Kirkland Tennis Challenger - Singles